Joan Baptista Pujol i Riu (Spanish Juan Bautista Pujol, Barcelona, 1835–1898) was a Catalan pianist and pedagogue. He studied at the Paris Conservatory with Napoleón-Henri Reber. He was the teacher of Enrique Granados, Ricardo Viñes, and Joaquim Malats (1872-1912).

References

1835 births
1898 deaths
Catalan pianists
Spanish classical pianists
Male classical pianists
19th-century Spanish male musicians